United Nations Security Council resolution 718, adopted unanimously on 31 October 1991, after recalling resolutions 668 (1990) and 717 (1991), and noting that at the Paris Conference, a political agreement was signed by parties to the situation in Cambodia, the Council authorised the Secretary-General to submit a report on the costs for the United Nations Transitional Authority in Cambodia, prior to its establishment.

The Council welcomed the political agreement, which the four parties decided to create "a system of liberal democracy, on the basis of pluralism." It went on to authorise the Secretary-General to designate a special representative for Cambodia to act on his behalf, welcoming his decision to send a survey mission to the country to prepare plans for implementing the mandate agreed at the Paris Conference. The resolution also called for the co-operation of the Supreme National Council of Cambodia and all parties with the Mission regarding the implementation of the agreements in the political settlement, and for all parties to observe a ceasefire.

The Secretary-General's report was examined in Resolution 745.

See also
 List of United Nations Security Council Resolutions 701 to 800 (1991–1993)
 Modern Cambodia
 Transition of the People's Republic of Kampuchea to Cambodia
 United Nations Advance Mission in Cambodia

References

External links
 
Text of the Resolution at undocs.org

 0718
20th century in Cambodia
Political history of Cambodia
 0718
October 1991 events
1991 in Cambodia